Manganese(II) chlorate is an unstable chemical compound with the formula Mn(ClO3)2. It is unstable even in dilute solution. As a hexahydrate, it is solid below −18°C. Above this it melts, to form an extremely explosive pink liquid.

Preparation
Manganese(II) chlorate was produced by the reaction of manganese(II) sulfate and barium chlorate. The water was removed by boiling in vacuum. Then the temperature was lowered to -80°C which resulted in a pink solid. Then it was cleaned with liquid nitrogen and potassium hydroxide to remove the decomposition products.

Properties
Manganese(II) chlorate forms the hexahydrate when solid, the water that cannot be removed. It decomposes above 6°C, to manganese(IV) oxide, chlorine dioxide, and water. In liquid form it is very viscous and extremely explosive. When heated to room temperature, it explodes with a sharp report.

References

Manganese(II) compounds
Chlorates